The 2018 CFL season was the 65th season of modern-day Canadian football. Officially, it was the 61st Canadian Football League season. Edmonton hosted the 106th Grey Cup on November 25, 2018. The CFL announced that this season will move to a 21-week regular season (previously a 20-week season) to increase player rest time and reduce short turnaround-times for games. Given the change, the regular season began on June 14, 2018, one week earlier than usual, and concluded on November 3, 2018.

CFL News in 2018

Salary cap
According to the new collective bargaining agreement, the 2018 salary cap will be set at $5,200,000 (average of $113,043 per active roster spot). As per the agreement, the cap is fixed and will not vary with league revenue performance. The minimum player salary is $54,000. This will be the last season under the current CBA with this deal expiring May 15, 2019 or the first day of the 2019 training camp, whichever comes first.

Free agency
The 2018 free agency period began on Tuesday, February 13, 2018 at 12pm EST. All players eligible for free agency are unrestricted free agents, as is customary in the league.

New ball
On March 19, 2018, the CFL announced that it would introduce a new football for the 2018 season. The new ball, produced by Wilson Sporting Goods, matches the specifications of the ball used in the National Football League and uses the "slightly harder" Horween leather used in that league, but with the CFL's laces and its characteristic white striping.

CFL Week
Following the success of the week-long league and prospect showcase in March 2017, the league announced on September 9, 2017 that Mark's CFL Week would return and would be hosted by Winnipeg. The event took place from Thursday March 22 to Sunday March 25, 2018, and was highlighted by the CFL National Combine: In which, 52 2018 CFL Draft eligible prospects competed. The festivities were held at the RBC Convention Centre in Winnipeg. Similar to last year's installment, over 50 current players attended for fan engagement and media photo shoots. The 2018 Canadian Football Hall of Fame inductees (Scott Flory, Barron Miles, Tommy Hugo, Hank Ilesic, Brent Johnson, Frank Cosentino, and Paul Brule) were announced during a gala and the CFL Rules and Competition Committee meetings were held.

Schedule
On September 13, 2017, the league announced that the 2018 season would have a 21-week regular season schedule rather than the 20-week schedule used from 2004 to 2005 and 2014 to 2017 when the league had nine teams. This will be the longest, in terms of calendar days, that a CFL season has been. In this model, there will be 18 four-game weeks and three three-game weeks. Every team will have three bye weeks, up from the previous eight teams with two bye weeks and one team with three (while playing two games in one week). This change was also a probable result of the backlash received for the 2017 Ottawa Redblacks season schedule that saw the team play 17 games over the first 17 weeks and have their byes in weeks 18 and 20. Ottawa also had to play three games in 11 days as did the Toronto Argonauts, due to the five-game week in week 5.

On December 14, 2017, the CFL released the 2018 season schedule, which was almost two months earlier than in years past. The season opening game was hosted on June 14 by the Winnipeg Blue Bombers, the first time they have hosted that game since the 2014 season. The Grey Cup rematch, hosted by the Argonauts, took place in week 2, which was the first time since 2013 that it was not featured in week 1. Three-game weeks will take place in weeks 5, 9, and 14 as three teams will have byes during those weeks.

There are four triple headers, all occurring on Saturdays and after the Labour Day Classic games, presumably to avoid playing games on Sundays and interfering with TSN's broadcast of National Football League games. There are also 11 double headers this year, with one on a Thursday, three on Fridays, five on Saturdays, and two on Mondays (the traditional Labour Day and Thanksgiving contests). Other than the two Holiday Monday games, all games this season are played between Thursday and Sunday. This will be the fourth straight season to showcase Thursday Night Football with 10 of the first 11 weeks featuring Thursday night games, with every team hosting at least once. For the first time since 2014, there are not only all intra-divisional games in the last week of the regular season, but those games are also featured in the last three weeks of the regular season (which also occurred in 2014). There are nine home-and-home series, with the Argonauts playing the most, with four. The Hamilton Tiger-Cats have a delayed home-and-home series with the Saskatchewan Roughriders as both teams have a bye during week 5 (in which case, the Tiger-Cats also have four such series).

Front office changes

Coaching changes

Negotiation lists 
In late January 2018 CFL commissioner Randy Ambrosie announced that teams would be required to make public the names of 10 of the 45 players on their negotiation lists twice per year; once in February and once in December. The negotiation list is the process by which non-Canadian players enter the CFL; in lieu of a draft, teams instead unilaterally claim rights to any non-Canadian player by placing them on the list at any time on a first come, first served basis. The decision to go public was supported by the league's presidents, governors and general managers. On February 20, 2018 all nine CFL teams announced 10 players on their negotiation list.

NFL window 
On July 20, 2018 the nine CFL owners voted to reinstate the "NFL window". All players who sign contracts after August 20, 2018 will be eligible to work out (attend try-outs and mini-camps) and sign contracts with NFL teams during the off-season. CFL rookies will still be required to sign two year contracts, but now have the opportunity to have their contract terminated if signed by an NFL team after their first year.

Quarterback Safety 
In the middle of the CFL playoffs the CFL announced that they would be adding an eighth official to the final three playoff games with the sole purpose of identifying and penalizing any instances of violent impacts to the neck or head of a quarterback. The change came about as a result of injuries to Zach Collaros and Brandon Bridge who both received violent hits to the head.

Rules changes 
In March the CFL's Rules Committee submitted a variety of rule changes to the Board of Governors, to be implemented for the 2017 season. As was the case in 2017, the proposed changes once again focused on improving game flow and increasing player safety. The proposals were reviewed and accepted by the CFL's Board of Governors on May 23, 2018.

Accepted 
 Coaches are no longer able to challenge 'illegal contact on a receiver' penalties
 Replay official will automatically review "potential touchdowns", where the ball was stopped just short of the end-zone
 Replay official will also be able to change the time of the in-game clock during a challenge
 Penalizing 'blindside blocks' in which any player running backwards to their own goal-line delivers a forcible block on an opponent. The goal of this rule change is to reduce injuries, specifically head trauma
 Ban 'low blocks' outside the tackle box to reduce leg injures
 Expanded definition of 'spearing' to include situations where the tackling player delivers a hit with the helmet as the initial or primary point of contact. This rule would not apply to "a low running ball carrier"
 Removing a loophole in the 'sleeper play' rules in which players who enter the game could have stayed 'outside the numbers' and received the ball. If passed, all new players to join an offensive or special teams play will have to go in 'between the numbers' if they are to touch the ball (i.e. go into the huddle, or near the middle of the field)
 Simplification of what constitutes a legal pass from behind the line of scrimmage. Currently the requirement is for the ball to be behind the line of scrimmage at the time the passing player releases the pass. The proposed rule would instead require one, or either, of the passer's feet to be on, or behind, the line of scrimmage.
 Elimination of the 'force out' catch rule. All receivers will now have to get one foot in-bounds regardless of whether or not they are contacted by a defender while leaping/diving.
 Increase the penalty for 'pyramiding' (climbing or vaulting off the body of another player to attempt to block a kick) from 5 yards to 10 yards

Broadcasting
Broadcast agreements with the ESPN family of networks, including TSN in Canada, continue. In the United States, games not carried on ESPN's linear networks will now be placed behind a hard paywall for all viewers as ESPN+ takes over streaming those games; they had previously been carried on ESPN3, the cost of which had been bundled into the price set by the Internet service provider.

Although the CFL's agreement with TSN has since been extended to 2021, that extension did not cover U.S. rights, which expire after 2018. The CFL has admitted courting a return to NFL Network, which carried the league's games in 2010 and 2011; such a move would require the league to move its schedule a month earlier than it starts now, potentially overlapping with the Stanley Cup Finals.

The league continued to make games available to fans outside of major broadcast areas via its CFL International Service.  In partnership with Yare Media, all games were made available over the internet to over 100 countries.

Regular season

Structure 

Teams play eighteen regular season games, playing two divisional opponents three times and all of the other teams twice. Teams were awarded two points for a win and one point for a tie. The top three teams in each division qualified for the playoffs, with the first place team gaining a bye to the divisional finals. A fourth place team in one division may qualify ahead of the third place team in the other division (the "Crossover"), if they earn more points in the season. If a third-place team finishes in a tie with the fourth place team in the other division, the third place team automatically gets the playoff spot and there is no crossover.

If two or more teams in the same division were equal in points, the following tiebreakers applied:

 Most wins in all games
 Head to head winning percentage (matches won divided by all matches played)
 Head to head points difference
 Head to head points ratio
 Tiebreakers 3–5 applied sequentially to all divisional games
 Tiebreakers 4 and 5 applied sequentially to all league games
 Coin toss

Notes:

1. If two clubs remain tied after other club(s) are eliminated during any step, tie breakers reverts to step 2.

Standings

Note: GP = Games Played, W = Wins, L = Losses, T = Ties, PF = Points For, PA = Points Against, Pts = Points

Teams in bold are in playoff positions.

Tie-breaker notes

BC and Edmonton finished fourth and fifth respectively in the West because BC won the season series over Edmonton.

Results

CFL Playoffs

The Grey Cup was played at The Brick Field at Commonwealth Stadium on November 25, 2018. Stampeders' QB, Bo Levi Mitchell was named Grey Cup MVP and Stampeders' wide receiver, Lemar Durant was named the Grey Cup's Most Valuable Canadian.

Playoff bracket

Award winners

CFL Top Performers of the WeekSourceCFL Top Performers of the MonthSource Attendance 

2018 CFL All-Stars

 Offence 
QB – Bo Levi Mitchell, Calgary Stampeders
RB – Andrew Harris, Winnipeg Blue Bombers
R – D'haquille Williams, Edmonton Eskimos
R – Brandon Banks, Hamilton Tiger-Cats
R – Brad Sinopoli, Ottawa Redblacks
R – Luke Tasker, Hamilton Tiger-Cats
R – Bryan Burnham, BC Lions
OT – Stanley Bryant, Winnipeg Blue Bombers
OT – SirVincent Rogers, Ottawa Redblacks
OG – Brandon Revenberg, Hamilton Tiger-Cats
OG – Brendon LaBatte, Saskatchewan Roughriders
C – Matthias Goossen, Winnipeg Blue Bombers

 Defence 
DT – Micah Johnson, Calgary Stampeders
DT – Davon Coleman, BC Lions
DE – Willie Jefferson, Saskatchewan Roughriders
DE – Charleston Hughes, Saskatchewan Roughriders
LB – Adam Bighill, Winnipeg Blue Bombers
LB – Alex Singleton, Calgary Stampeders
CLB – Don Unamba, Hamilton Tiger-Cats
CB – Delvin Breaux, Hamilton Tiger-Cats
CB – Anthony Orange,  BC Lions
HB – Ed Gainey, Saskatchewan Roughriders
HB – T. J. Lee, BC Lions
S – Taylor Loffler, Winnipeg Blue Bombers

 Special teams 
K – Lewis Ward, Ottawa Redblacks
P – Ty Long, BC Lions
ST – Diontae Spencer, Ottawa RedblacksSource2018 CFL Western All-Stars

 Offence 
QB – Bo Levi Mitchell, Calgary Stampeders
RB – Andrew Harris, Winnipeg Blue Bombers
R – Darvin Adams, Winnipeg Blue Bombers
R – Bryan Burnham, BC Lions
R – D'haquille Williams, Edmonton Eskimos
R – Kamar Jorden, Calgary Stampeders
R – Derel Walker, Edmonton Eskimos
OT – Stanley Bryant, Winnipeg Blue Bombers
OT – Derek Dennis, Calgary Stampeders
OG – Brendon LaBatte, Saskatchewan Roughriders
OG – Sukh Chungh, Winnipeg Blue Bombers
C – Matthias Goossen, Winnipeg Blue Bombers

 Defence 
DT – Micah Johnson, Calgary Stampeders
DT – Davon Coleman, BC Lions
DE – Willie Jefferson, Saskatchewan Roughriders
DE – Charleston Hughes, Saskatchewan Roughriders
LB – Adam Bighill, Winnipeg Blue Bombers
LB – Alex Singleton, Calgary Stampeders
CLB – Otha Foster, BC Lions
CB – Anthony Orange,  BC Lions
CB – Ciante Evans, Calgary Stampeders
HB – Ed Gainey, Saskatchewan Roughriders
HB – T. J. Lee, BC Lions
S – Taylor Loffler, Winnipeg Blue Bombers

 Special teams 
K – Brett Lauther, Saskatchewan Roughriders
P – Ty Long, BC Lions
ST – Chris Rainey, BC LionsSource2018 CFL Eastern All-Stars

 Offence 
QB – Jeremiah Masoli, Hamilton Tiger-Cats
RB – William Powell, Ottawa Redblacks
R – Brandon Banks, Hamilton Tiger-Cats
R – Brad Sinopoli, Ottawa Redblacks
R – Greg Ellingson, Ottawa Redblacks
R – Luke Tasker, Hamilton Tiger-Cats
R – S. J. Green, Toronto Argonauts
OT – SirVincent Rogers, Ottawa Redblacks
OT – Chris Van Zeyl, Toronto Argonauts
OG – Brandon Revenberg, Hamilton Tiger-Cats
OG – Ryan Bomben, Toronto Argonauts
C – Alex Mateas, Ottawa Redblacks

 Defence 
DT – Ted Laurent, Hamilton Tiger-Cats
DT – Cleyon Laing, Toronto Argonauts
DE – A.C. Leonard, Ottawa Redblacks
DE – John Bowman, Montreal Alouettes
LB – Larry Dean, Hamilton Tiger-Cats
LB – Hénoc Muamba, Montreal Alouettes
CLB – Don Unamba, Hamilton Tiger-Cats
CB – Delvin Breaux, Hamilton Tiger-Cats
CB – Jonathan Rose, Ottawa Redblacks
HB – Rico Murray, Ottawa Redblacks
HB – Cariel Brooks, Hamilton Tiger-Cats
S – Branden Dozier, Montreal Alouettes

 Special teams 
K – Lewis Ward, Ottawa Redblacks
P – Richie Leone, Ottawa Redblacks
ST – Diontae Spencer, Ottawa RedblacksSource''

2018 CFL Awards
 CFL's Most Outstanding Player Award – Bo Levi Mitchell (QB), Calgary Stampeders
 CFL's Most Outstanding Canadian Award – Brad Sinopoli (WR), Ottawa Redblacks
 CFL's Most Outstanding Defensive Player Award – Adam Bighill (LB), Winnipeg Blue Bombers
 CFL's Most Outstanding Offensive Lineman Award – Stanley Bryant, (OT), Winnipeg Blue Bombers
 CFL's Most Outstanding Rookie Award – Lewis Ward (K), Ottawa Redblacks
 John Agro Special Teams Award – Lewis Ward (K), Ottawa Redblacks
 Tom Pate Memorial Award – Ryan King (LS), Edmonton Eskimos
 Jake Gaudaur Veterans' Trophy – Rolly Lumbala (FB), BC Lions
 Annis Stukus Trophy – Chris Jones, Saskatchewan Roughriders
 Commissioner's Award – Pierre Vercheval
 Hugh Campbell Distinguished Leadership Award – Wally Buono

References

External links

Canadian Football League seasons
2018 in Canadian football